Claudio Pieri (21 October 1940 – 13 July 2018) was an Italian football referee.

Career

Belonging to the AIA section of Genoa, he began his career in Serie A in the Inter - Roma match on 18 May 1975 , ending 0-2 for the Romans.

For the 2009-2010 season, he was involved in the Talent and Mentor project, aimed at the accurate training of young referees.

Controversy

In 1987, he was disqualified by the AIA Disciplinary Committee for having received several checks from the management of Palermo as funding for his election campaign with the DC, that were not reported in time to the AIA technical bodies.

References

1940 births
2018 deaths
FIFA officials
People from Pescia
Sportspeople from the Province of Pistoia